7959 Alysecherri, provisional designation , is a bright, stony Hungaria asteroid from the inner regions of the asteroid belt, approximately 3 kilometers in diameter. It was discovered on 2 August 1994, by American astronomer Carl Hergenrother at Steward Observatory's Catalina Station on Mt Bigelow near Tucson, Arizona. The asteroid was named for the discoverer's wife, Alyse Cherri.

Orbit and classification 

The E-type asteroid is a member of the Hungaria family, which form the innermost dense concentration of asteroids in the Solar System. It orbits the Sun in the inner main-belt at a distance of 1.8–2.1 AU once every 2 years and 9 months (989 days). Its orbit has an eccentricity of 0.09 and an inclination of 19° with respect to the ecliptic. The first precovery was taken at Palomar Observatory in 1951, extending the asteroid's observation arc by 43 years prior to its discovery.

Physical characteristics 

A rotational lightcurve for this asteroid was obtained from photometric observations made by American astronomer Brian Warner at the U.S. Palmer Divide Observatory, Colorado, in July 2013. It gave a rotation period of  hours with a brightness amplitude of 0.13 in magnitude. The Collaborative Asteroid Lightcurve Link assumes an albedo of 0.30 and calculates a diameter of 3.05 kilometers with an absolute magnitude of 14.5.

Naming 

This minor planet is named after the maiden name of the discovering astronomer's wife, Alyse Cherri Smith. The official naming citation was published by the Minor Planet Center on 13 November 2008.

References

External links 
  
 Asteroid Lightcurve Database (LCDB), query form (info )
 Dictionary of Minor Planet Names, Google books
 Asteroids and comets rotation curves, CdR – Observatoire de Genève, Raoul Behrend
 Discovery Circumstances: Numbered Minor Planets (5001)-(10000) – Minor Planet Center
 
 

007959
Discoveries by Carl W. Hergenrother
Named minor planets
007959
19940802